Portrait of a Young Man Wearing Lynx Fur, Gentleman with a Lynx Pelt or Portrait of a Man is a 1560 painting by Paolo Veronese, produced during his stay in Rome and showing similarities to his Baptism of Christ (Herzog Anton Ulrich Museum, Brunswick) and The Anointing of David (Kunsthistorisches Museum, Vienna). It is now in the Museum of Fine Arts in Budapest.

References

Young Man
1560 paintings
Paintings in the collection of the Museum of Fine Arts (Budapest)